La Compagnie Créole is a popular French pop band from French Guiana and the French West Indies, founded in the 1970's. They originally started singing in Creole but quickly adopted French as their main language. They are known mostly for the feel-good and happy-go-lucky quality reverberating in all of their songs: popular themes and imagery include colorful rainbows, sunshine, music and harmless animals as a positive morale booster all set to Caribbean rhythms. Many of their records have been produced by Daniel Vangarde.

Biography
Founded in 1975, the group released their first album, "Ba mwen en ti bo" in 1976, with the album "Blogodo" following in 1982. In 1983, two of their most popular songs, "Vive le Douanier Rousseau !" and "C'est bon pour le moral" were released, with  400 000 et 500 000 records sold, respectively. From 1984 to 1987, the group released additional popular songs, including "Le Bal masqué", "Ça fait rire les oiseaux" and "Ma première biguine-partie."

The group received top billing in the fourth and fifth seasons of "Âge tendre, la tournée des idoles" a tour composed of musical acts originating from the 1960's and the 1970's. On May 27, 2011, a celebration in their honour was held in Paris.

In the summer of 2020, they released a parody of their song "Le bal masqué" under the title of "Sortons masqués" (Let's go out wearing masks) to encourage wearing masks during the COVID-19 pandemic.

The group has produced over 23 albums, and claims to have sold over 60 million records.

Members
Clémence Bringtown – born 17 December 1948, Le Robert, Martinique (vocals) 
Arthur Apatou –  born 6 June 1951, Pointe a Pitre, Guadeloupe (Guitar)
José Sébéloue –  born 17 September 1948, Ouanary, French Guiana (Guitar, percussion, vocals)
Julien Tarquin –  born 16 September 1948, Marigot, Martinique   (Bass, vocals)
Jean-Marc Vivenza –  born 26 December 1957, Marigot, Saint-Martin  (Keyboards, intonarumori, percussion)
Guy Bevert –  born 18 February 1949, Basse-Terre, Guadeloupe  (drums, percussion, vocals)

Discography

Studio albums 
Ba mwen en ti bo (1976)
Blogodo (1982)
Vive le douanier Rousseau (1983)
Le Bal masqué (1984)
Bons baisers de Fort de France (1984)
Ça fait rire les oiseaux (1986)
Sans chemise sans pantalon (1986)
Soca Party sur la plage (1986)
La Bonne Aventure (1989)
Bon anniversaire maman (1990)
Megamix (1990)

Tribute album 
A tribute album titled Les machines à danser (dancing machines) was released in June 2010; the album includes covers by Québécois artists such as Ariane Moffatt, Dubmatique and Afrodizz.

References

External links 
Official site

French Guianan music